Anthony Fernandes  is a former Indian footballer.

Coaching career

Air India: 2012–2013
Fernandes technically took over as the interim head coach of Air India FC in October after then current head coach Godfrey Pereira was revealed to be away from the team due to salary issues. However Fernandes was officially made the interim head coach of the I-League side on 30 December 2012, three days after it was confirmed that Pereira had left his post, when Air India played against Salgaocar F.C. at the Duler Stadium in the I-League in which Air India lost the match 4–0.

Statistics

Coach
Since 2 March 2013

References

Living people

Indian football managers
I-League managers

Air India FC managers
Place of birth missing (living people)
Year of birth missing (living people)
Indian footballers 
Footballers from Goa
Bengal Mumbai FC players

Association footballers not categorized by position